Marija Agbaba Lanistanin (born 9 August 1995) is a Serbian handball player for Békéscsabai Előre NKSE and the Serbian national team.

She represented Serbia at the 2021 World Women's Handball Championship.

Her younger sister Jelena Agbaba currently plays for Moyra-Budaörs Handball.

References

External links

Serbian female handball players
1995 births
Living people
Sportspeople from Kikinda
Expatriate handball players
Serbian expatriate sportspeople in Hungary
Békéscsabai Előre NKSE players